KCLN (1390 AM) is a commercial radio station licensed to serve the community of Clinton, Iowa.  KCLN primarily airs an automated oldies format. KCLN and its sister station KMCN 94.7 MHz (formerly 97.7 MHz) were owned from 1999 to 2018 by Prairie Radio Communications, which purchased the facilities from K to Z Ltd. who had been the owners of the AM/FM combo since 1990. KCLN began broadcasting in 1956. 
The KCLN call letters supposedly were an initialism for "Keep Clinton Listeners Notified". They changed the call letters to KLNT which existed from 1978 to 1998. The format was generally Country Music during that time.

The KCLN-AM antenna uses two towers arranged in a directional array, concentrating the signal north–south along the Mississippi River. One of the two towers hosts the FM antenna for sister station KMCN.

Effective March 15, 2018, Prairie Radio sold KCLN and KMCN to Gendreau Broadcast LLC for $240,000.

External links
KCLN official website

Wayback historical website
VIDEO: Wayne Larkey bungee jumps at Clinton Riverboat Days 1992

CLN
Clinton, Iowa